The Bourne Identity is a 1988 American mystery action thriller television movie adaptation of Robert Ludlum's 1980 novel The Bourne Identity. The film adaptation was written by Carol Sobieski, directed by Roger Young for Warner Bros. Television with Richard Chamberlain in the title role, along with Jaclyn Smith. It follows the storyline of the original novel, with a run-time of 3 hours 5 min. With commercials added, the running time was extended to four hours. The film was first shown on ABC in two 120 minute installments over two nights.

The book was adapted again in 2002 by Doug Liman starring Matt Damon as Jason Bourne, launching the Bourne series of theatrical films, with considerable deviations from the original Cold War novel. It was followed later by a new series of Bourne best sellers written by Eric Lustbader with the permission of the Ludlum estate.

Differences from the book
The film exhibits some differences from the novel by Ludlum. The undercover identity of Jason Bourne is simplified to "Bourne" pursuing Carlos rather than using the code name "Cain". Alexander Conklin is killed by one of his own people when attempting to confront Bourne; in the novel he survives and appears in subsequent novels. In the book's ending, Carlos the Jackal escapes in the confusion, whereas in the film he is killed in the climactic battle with Bourne.

Cast
Richard Chamberlain as Jason Bourne
Jaclyn Smith as Marie St. Jacques
Anthony Quayle as Gen. François Villiers
Donald Moffat as David Abbott
Shane Rimmer as Alexander Conklin
Yorgo Voyagis as Carlos
Denholm Elliott as Dr. Geoffrey Washburn
Peter Vaughan as Fritz Koenig
Michael Habeck as The Fat Man 
Wolf Kahler as Gold Glasses
Philip Madoc as D'Armacourt
Bill Wallis as Chernak

References

Further reading
 Tibbetts, John C., and James M. Welsh, eds. The Encyclopedia of Novels Into Film (2nd ed. 2005) pp 39–42.

External links
 

1988 films
1988 television films
1980s mystery films
1980s spy films
1980s action thriller films
American action thriller films
American mystery thriller films
American political thriller films
Action television films
Crime television films
Films about amnesia
Films based on American novels
Films based on mystery novels
Films based on works by Robert Ludlum
Films directed by Roger Young
Films scored by Laurence Rosenthal
Films shot in Switzerland
1980s French-language films
1980s German-language films
Spy television films
American thriller television films
Cultural depictions of Carlos the Jackal
Films shot in France
Films shot in Zürich
Jason Bourne
1980s English-language films
1980s American films
Films with screenplays by Carol Sobieski